The Gersprenz Valley Railway is a defunct railway track in the Gersprenz valley of the Odenwald that was operated until 1963 and ran from Reichelsheim via Fränkisch‐Crumbach, Brensbach, and Groß-Bieberau to Reinheim. Folklore had named the railway Odenwälder Lieschen ("Lisa of the Odenwald" in the diminutive). Rails were dismantled from Bieberau southwards in 1964.

See also
Odenwaldbahn

References

Railway lines closed in 1962
Railway lines in Hesse
1962 disestablishments in Germany